William Chang Suk-ping (born 12 November 1953) is a Hong Kong production designer, costume designer and film editor. Along with cinematographer Christopher Doyle, Chang is an important collaborator with Hong Kong film director Wong Kar-wai. He has also collaborated with directors such as Stanley Kwan, Patrick Tam, Yim Ho, Tsui Hark, Jiang Wen and Johnnie To. He is of Shanghainese ancestry.

In 2014, Chang received an Academy Award for Best Costume Design nomination for his work on The Grandmaster.

See also
List of film director and editor collaborations

References

External links
 

Living people
Hong Kong art directors
Hong Kong film editors
Production designers
Chinese costume designers
1953 births